The 1993 World Snooker Championship (also referred to as the 1993 Embassy World Snooker Championship for the purposes of sponsorship) was a professional ranking snooker tournament that took place between 17 April and 3 May 1993 at the Crucible Theatre in Sheffield, England.

The tournament was sponsored by cigarette manufacturer Embassy.

Tournament summary 

 Ronnie O'Sullivan made his World Championship debut at the age of 17 years and 5 months, making him the second-youngest player since Stephen Hendry in 1986. O'Sullivan lost against Alan McManus 7–10 in the first round.
Spencer Dunn made his Crucible debut, after winning eleven qualifying matches—a tournament record—to secure his place in the main draw. He defeated Ian Bullimore 5–1, Colin Mitchell 5–1, Elliott Clark 5–4, Neil Selman 5–1, Julian Goodyear 5–1, Kieran McAlinden 5–4, Mehmet Husnu 5–2, Bill Oliver 10–2, Colin Roscoe 10–7, Dave Harold 10–7, and Mark Bennett 10–9, before his first-round match against Nigel Bond. Fellow debutants O'Sullivan and John Giles both won ten qualifying matches to reach the Crucible stages.
The other debutants this year were Brian Morgan, Joe Swail, Karl Payne, Shaun Mellish and Stephen O'Connor. The high number of debutants was partially a result of the governing body's decision to begin pre-qualifying at the beginning of the season. Of this year's rookies, only Morgan, O'Sullivan and Swail ever qualified for another World Championship.
 In frame three of his first-round match, Hendry compiled the 250th century break at the Crucible.
1981 runner-up and former Masters and twice UK Champion, Doug Mountjoy, played in his last World Championship main draw. He had appeared at every World Championship since the event moved to the Crucible in 1977, a run of 17 consecutive appearances. Mountjoy reached the second round, falling 6–13 to Jimmy White. Weeks later, Mountjoy had an operation to remove his left lung after being diagnosed with stage 2 lung cancer.
Dennis Taylor's 13–11 second-round victory over Terry Griffiths set a record for the longest best-of-25-frames match in professional play at almost 800 minutes.
James Wattana of Thailand became the first player from the Far East to reach the semi-finals of the event.
The previous two were in 1983 and 1989.

Prize fund
The breakdown of prize money for this year is shown below: 
Winner: £175,000
Runner-up: £105,000
Semi-final: £52,000
Quarter-final: £26,000
Last 16: £14,000
Last 32: £8,000
Highest break: £14,400
Maximum break: £100,000
Total: £1,000,000

Main draw 
Shown below are the results for each round. The numbers in parentheses beside some of the players are their seeding ranks (each championship has 16 seeds and 16 qualifiers).

Century breaks 
There were 35 century breaks in the championship, a new record, beating the 31 centuries of 1991. The highest break of the event was a 144 made by Steve Davis.

 144  Steve Davis
 139, 122, 101  Nigel Bond
 138, 106  Steve James
 136, 129, 128, 126, 124, 123, 113, 110  Stephen Hendry
 133  Terry Griffiths
 124, 108, 100, 100  Neal Foulds
 122, 102  John Parrott

 121  Martin Clark
 112  Alan McManus
 110, 104, 104, 103  James Wattana
 108, 105, 104  Jimmy White
 108, 104  Willie Thorne
 105  Peter Ebdon
 104, 101  Gary Wilkinson

References 

1993
World Championship
World Snooker Championship
Sports competitions in Sheffield
April 1993 sports events in the United Kingdom
May 1993 sports events in the United Kingdom